Ferdinando Ruggeri (Florence, 1691–1741) was an Italian architect, active in Florence during the late Baroque period.

Ruggèri helped design the left facade of the Church of San Firenze (1715), the Palazzo Capponi in Florence, the Palazzo Sansedoni (1736) in Siena, and the collegiata (1738) of Empoli. He also published books of architecture.

References

1691 births
1741 deaths
18th-century Italian architects